The following individuals have been identified as senior officers (currently or in the past) of the Islamic Revolutionary Guard Corps (IRGC), which is a branch of the Iranian Armed Forces.

Commanders-in-Chief
Javad Mansouri was IRGC's "first unofficial commander" and acting during its "early formative phase". Abbas Agha-Zamani, however is considered the "first official operational commander" and was appointed by the Commander-in-Chief.

Deputy Commanders-in-Chief

Chiefs of the Joint Staff

Commanders of military branches

Ground Forces

Aerospace Force

Navy

Quds Force

Basij

Chairmen of intelligence agencies

Intelligence Organization

Intelligence Protection Organization

Supreme Leader Representatives

Ministers

See also
 List of commanders of the Islamic Republic of Iran Army

References

Islamic Revolutionary Guards